Manilkara paraensis is a species of plant in the family Sapotaceae. It is endemic to Brazil, where it is threatened by habitat loss.

References

paraensis
Plants described in 1904
Conservation dependent plants
Flora of Brazil
Taxonomy articles created by Polbot